Federal Medical Centre Ebute-Metta, Lagos is a tertiary hospital located in Nigerian Railway Corporation Compound in Ebute-Metta, Lagos.

History 
Federal Medical Centre, Ebute-Metta, Lagos was established in 1964. It started out as the Department of Health Services of the Nigerian Railway Corporation. It was created exclusively to cater for the health needs of NRC staff and their families.

During the Nigerian Civil War, it became an annex of the Lagos University Teaching Hospital (LUTH), Idiaraba, Lagos for the treatment of wounded soldiers.

On May 26, 2004, the Federal Executive Council (FEC) approved the upgrading of the Nigerian Railway Hospital to a Federal Medical Centre and on 31 January 2005, the hospital was formally handed over to the Federal Ministry of Health as a Tertiary Healthcare Institution and designated as Federal Medical Centre, Ebute-Metta, Lagos.

It is a training institution for Resident Doctors and House Officers in Anaesthesia, Family Medicine, Obstetrics and Gynaecology, Radiology and Surgery.

References 

1964 establishments in Nigeria
Hospitals in Lagos
Hospitals established in 1964
Lagos Mainland